Luigi Samoggia (1811 - 1904) was an Italian painter and restorer of paintings, active mainly in Bologna.
 
He mainly painted fresco decoration for palaces, churches, and theaters. He worked in the Palazzo Malvezzi-Medici, Santi Gregorio e Siro, Santa Maria della Carità, San Salvatore, Corpus Domini, San Giuliano, and the Palazzo Legnani. He painted in the theaters of Viterbo, Macerata, Fabriano, and Pesaro.

References

1811 births
1904 deaths
19th-century Italian painters
Italian male painters
20th-century Italian painters
Painters from Bologna
19th-century Italian male artists
20th-century Italian male artists